The Chicago Subdivision or Chicago Sub is a railroad line in Illinois that runs about  from Chicago to Aurora and hosts Metra's BNSF Railway Line commuter service.  It is operated by BNSF Railway as the easternmost part of the railroad's Northern Transcon to Seattle, Washington. This line is known as the Racetrack because it is mostly triple-tracked and supports fairly fast trains.  It had been operated by a BNSF ancestor, the Chicago, Burlington and Quincy Railroad, which introduced high-speed Zephyr passenger trains in 1934 and ran many of them along this subdivision from Chicago to points west.

The Chicago Subdivision meets the Aurora Subdivision and Mendota Subdivision in Aurora.  Commuter service ends at the Aurora Transportation Center, though Amtrak trains continue southwest on the Mendota Subdivision.  Triple-tracking runs from where track leading to the Aurora station and Metra Yard joins the subdivision eastward to Cicero, where multiple tracks from a yard join.  It is then quadruple-tracked for the rest of the way until the turn to Union Station.  weekday traffic on the subdivision was 94 Metra commuter trains, eight Amtrak intercity trains, and 60 BNSF freight trains.

After the introduction of the CB&Q Zephyrs, train speeds increased significantly around the country for the next decade or so, but the Naperville train disaster along these tracks in 1946 was one event that contributed to the federal government restricting speeds in later years.

See also
 BNSF Railway Line

References

External links
 
BNSF Subdivisions

BNSF Railway lines
Rail lines in Illinois